Bright Memory, also known as Bright Memory: Episode 1, is a first-person shooter video game developed by Chinese-based FYQD Personal Studio.

Created by a single developer in his spare time, it was initially released through Steam's Early Access program for Microsoft Windows on 12 January 2019, eventually leaving early access on 25 March 2020. Additionally, the game was released for mobile platforms between 2019 and 2020, as well as for the Xbox Series X/S as one of its launch titles on 10 November 2020.

Instead of creating an Episode 2, the game was remade and expanded in both gameplay and story into a full-length title called Bright Memory: Infinite, released on Windows and Xbox Series X/S in 2021. Players who have bought the Windows version of Bright Memory will be able to get Bright Memory: Infinite for free.

Gameplay 
Bright Memory is a first-person shooter with melee elements. Players take control of Shelia, who, in addition to using guns and a sword, also has supernatural abilities such as psychokinesis and unleashing energy blasts. All forms of attack can be combined as desired and the game will award letter grades to creative combinations similar to Devil May Cry. Success in combat awards experience points that can be used to augment the character's skills and to unlock more abilities such as stopping time. Additionally, some areas feature puzzles that need to be solved. The early access version of the first episode features about an hour of gameplay with the developer announcing another two hours of gameplay by the end of 2019 with more episodes in the following years.

Synopsis 
Protagonist Shelia is tasked by the Science Research Organization (SRO) for which she works to prevent SAI, a military organization, from acquiring a legendary ancient power that can reawaken the dead. The game takes place in a "Land of Sky" located above the Arctic consisting of levitating land masses which are home to ancient creatures.

Development 
Bright Memory was developed by Zeng "FYQD" Xiancheng using Unreal Engine 4 with development work taking place in the developer's spare time. Zeng first previewed the game in a trailer in 2017 and received financial support through Epic Games's Unreal Dev Grants.

An early access version of "Episode One" was released worldwide on 12 January 2019. The game supports the Oculus Rift virtual reality goggles.

Stolen assets controversy 
In January 2019, Zeng admitted on a post on Sina Weibo that he has used some enemy models without acquiring a license and modified them for use in the game but did not specify which models or which games they were from. In reaction, Zeng announced that he would use the money from the game's sales to hire an art designer and reach out to the original rights holders.

Reception

Episode 1 

Bright Memory: Episode 1 received "mixed or average" reviews, according to review aggregator Metacritic, for having occasional bugs and almost unintelligible instructions, as it was translated from Chinese. Nevertheless, Rock Paper Shotgun opined that the game has both the look and feel of a shooter game developed with a large budget, and 'wipes the floor' compared to some much higher priced games. The music and translation were criticized as was the short length since the game does not feature any endless mode.

Infinite 

Bright Memory: Infinite received "mixed or average" reviews according to review aggregator Metacritic.

References

External links
Bright Memory on Steam
Bright Memory: Infinite on Steam

Xbox website

2019 video games
Android (operating system) games
Early access video games
First-person shooters
Hack and slash games
IOS games
Indie video games
Nintendo Switch games
PlayStation 5 games
Science fiction video games
Single-player video games
Unreal Engine games
Video games developed in China
Video games featuring female protagonists
Windows games
Xbox Series X and Series S games
Playism games